In linguistics, a feature of a word or phrase is said to be covert if there is no surface evidence of its existence within that word or phrase. For example, many languages have covert grammatical gender in nouns, in that there is no way to tell from the form of a noun which gender it is; gender only becomes apparent in, for example, articles and adjectival agreement, which depend on gender. In German instruction, the article (der, die, das) is generally taught along with a noun, so that the student may remember which gender the noun is. In spoken French, grammatical number is largely covert: the singular and plural forms of most nouns are identical in pronunciation. However, number is still relevant, as it affects articles and verbal agreement, so it is still logical to say that one instance of a noun is singular, and that another instance, pronounced identically, is plural.

A covert feature is different from a null morpheme, such as the English singular, which is marked by the absence of a morpheme that occurs elsewhere. That is, whereas in English the null-marked singular contrasts with an overt -s plural in most nouns, in French both singular and plural are null; in English it is clear that cat is singular, because it is not the plural cats, whereas in spoken French, it cannot be known whether chat(s)  spoken in isolation is singular or plural.

See also 
 Zero-marking language

Linguistic typology